Planetary engineering is the development and application of technology for the purpose of influencing the environment of a planet. Planetary engineering encompasses a variety of methods such as terraforming, seeding, and geoengineering.

Widely discussed in the scientific community, terraforming refers to the alteration of other planets to create a habitable environment for terrestrial life. Seeding refers to the introduction of life from Earth to habitable planets. Geoengineering refers to the engineering of a planet's climate, and has already been applied on Earth. Each of these methods are composed of varying approaches and possess differing levels of feasibility and ethical concern.

Terraforming

Terraforming is the process of modifying the atmosphere, temperature, surface topography or ecology of a planet, moon, or other body in order to replicate the environment of Earth.

Technologies 
A common object of discussion on potential terraforming is the planet Mars. To terraform Mars, humans would need to create a new atmosphere, due to the planet's high carbon dioxide concentration and low atmospheric pressure. This would be possible by introducing more greenhouse gases to below "freezing point from indigenous materials". To terraform Venus, carbon dioxide would need to be converted to graphite since Venus receives twice as much sunlight as Earth. This process is only possible if the greenhouse effect is removed with the use of "high-altitude absorbing fine particles" or a sun shield, creating a more habitable Venus.

NASA has defined categories of habitability systems and technologies for terraforming to be feasible. These topics include creating power-efficient systems for preserving and packaging  food for crews, preparing and cooking foods, dispensing water, and developing facilities for rest, trash and recycling, and areas for crew hygiene and rest.

Feasibility 
A variety of planetary engineering challenges stand in the way of terraforming efforts. The atmospheric terraforming of Mars, for example, would require "significant quantities of gas" to be added to the Martian atmosphere. This gas has been thought to be stored in solid and liquid form within Mars' polar ice caps and underground reservoirs. It is unlikely, however, that enough  for sufficient atmospheric change is present within Mars' polar deposits, and liquid  could only be present at warmer temperatures "deep within the crust". Furthermore, sublimating the entire volume of Mars' polar caps would increase its current atmospheric pressure to 15 millibar, where an increase to around 1000 millibar would be required for habitability. For reference, Earth's average sea-level pressure is 1013.25 mbar.

First formally proposed by astrophysicist Carl Sagan, the terraforming of Venus has since been discussed through methods such as organic molecule-induced carbon conversion, sun reflection, increasing planetary spin, and various chemical means. Due to the high presence of sulfuric acid and solar wind on Venus, which are harmful to organic environments, organic methods of carbon conversion have been found unfeasible. Other methods, such as solar shading, hydrogen bombardment, and magnesium-calcium bombardment are theoretically sound but would require large-scale resources and space technologies not yet available to humans.

Ethical considerations 
While successful terraforming would allow life to prosper on other planets, philosophers have debated whether this practice is morally sound. Certain ethics experts suggest that planets like Mars hold an intrinsic value independent of their utility to humanity and should therefore be free from human interference. Through this ethical framework, terraforming attempts on these planets could be seen to threaten their intrinsically valuable environments, rendering these efforts unethical.

Seeding

Environmental considerations 
Mars is the primary subject of discussion for seeding. Locations for seeding are chosen based on atmospheric temperature, air pressure, existence of harmful radiation, and availability of natural resources, such as water and other compounds essential to terrestrial life.

Developing microorganisms for seeding 
Natural or engineered microorganisms must be created or discovered that can withstand the harsh environments of Mars. The first organisms used must be able to survive exposure to ionizing radiation and the high concentration of  present in the Martian atmosphere.

Microorganisms provide significant advantages over non-biological mechanisms. They are self-replicating, negating the needs to either transport or manufacture large machinery to the surface of Mars. They can also perform complicated chemical reactions with little maintenance to realize planet-scale terraforming.

Mars is the primary subject of discussion for seeding. Locations for seeding are chosen based on atmospheric temperature, air pressure, existence of harmful radiation, and availability of natural resources, such as water and other compounds essential to terrestrial life.

Geoengineering 

Geoengineering, or climate engineering, is a form of planetary engineering which involves the process of deliberate and large-scale alteration of the Earth's climate system to combat climate change. Examples of geoengineering are carbon dioxide removal (CDR), which removes carbon dioxide from the atmosphere, and the use of space mirrors to reflect solar energy to space. Carbon dioxide removal (CDR) has multiple practices, the simplest being reforestation, to more complex processes such as direct air capture. The latter is rather difficult to deploy on an industrial scale, for high costs and substantial energy usage would be some aspects to address.

Another geoengineering discipline is solar radiation management (SRM), which is the process of rapidly cooling down the Earth's temperature. Examples of this process include stimulating the cooling effect of volcanoes and enhancing the reflectivity of marine clouds. When a volcano erupts, small particles known as aerosols proliferate throughout the atmosphere, reflecting the sun's energy back into space. This results in a cooling effect, and humanity could conceivably inject these aerosols into the stratosphere, spurring large-scale cooling.

Marine cloud brightening (MCB) is a solar radiation management theory that is designed to make marine clouds brighter, reflecting light back into deep space. By reflecting light from the sun, this process could help offset anthropogenic global warming, which threatens the lives of all human beings and life on Earth. One proposal involves spraying a vapor into low-laying sea clouds, creating more cloud condensation nuclei. This would in theory result in the cloud becoming whiter, and reflecting light more efficiently.

See also
 Astroengineering
 Macro-engineering
 Megascale engineering
 Moving the Earth
 Virgin Earth Challenge

References

Further reading

External links
 Geoengineering: A Worldchanging Retrospective – Overview of articles on geoengineering from the sustainability site Worldchanging

 
Space colonization
Engineering disciplines